Gençali  is a village in Mut district of  Mersin Province, Turkey. At  its situated is the Toros Mountains to the east of Göksu River valley. The village was founded by two Turkmen tribes named Koçaşlı and Meçesli. The population of Gençali was 294  as of 2012. Main economic activity is agriculture.

References

Villages in Mut District